The Central Bank of Aruba  is the central bank in Aruba responsible for implementation of monetary policy of the Aruban florin.

History

The Centrale Bank van Aruba (the Bank) started its operations on January 1, 1986, when Aruba obtained its status as an autonomous country within the Kingdom of the Netherlands. Prior to this period, Aruba formed part of the Netherlands Antilles under jurisdiction of the Bank of the Netherlands Antilles.

The bank is a legal entity in itself (sui generis) with an autonomous position within Aruba's public sector. With the inception of the bank, the Aruban florin was brought into circulation at the same rate as the Netherlands Antillean guilder, pegged to the U.S. dollar at a rate of Afl. 1.79 (= 1 NAf.) = US$1.00. This exchange rate has remained unchanged since then.

The principle tasks of the bank are to maintain the internal and external value of the florin and to promote the soundness and integrity of the financial system.

Presidents
The Central Bank of Aruba is currently led by its president Mrs. Jeanette R Semeleer.

Hassan Ali Mehran, 1986
Don Mansur, 1986-19??
Emile den Dunnen, 1988-1991
Arthur Irausquin, 1991-1995
Hans du Marchie Sarvaas, 1995-1999
Anthony Karam, 1999-2003
Robert Henriquez, 2003-2007
Hassan Ali Mehran, Iranian, 2007-2008
Jeanette R Semeleer, 2008-

Main functions and activities

The principal tasks of the bank

The principal tasks of the bank, as stipulated in the Central Bank Ordinance (A.B. 1991 No. GT 32), are to:

Conduct monetary policy;
Supervise the financial system;
Issue bank notes;
Issue coins on behalf of the government;
Act as the banker for the government;
Be the central foreign exchange bank and, as such, to regulate the flow of payments to and from other countries; and to advise the Minister of Finance on financial matters.

Activities

The bank performs these tasks through a variety of activities, which include:

Formulating and implementing monetary policy and related measures through, among other things, regulating bank credit and liquidity;
 Supervising the activities of the commercial banks and other financial institutions by, inter alia, monitoring their liquidity and solvency to protect the interests of depositors and policyholders, and to maintain monetary and financial stability and integrity in Aruba;
 Managing Aruba's official gold and foreign exchange reserves;
 Regulating international payments according to the State Ordinance on foreign exchange transactions (A.B. 1990 No. GT 6);
 Bringing bank notes into circulation to meet the needs of businesses and the general public;
 Issuing treasury bills and government bonds as an agent for the government; and
Monitoring economic and financial developments.

See also

 Economy of Aruba
 Aruban florin
 Bank of the Netherlands Antilles
 Central Bank of Curaçao and Sint Maarten
 De Nederlandsche Bank

References

External links
 Centrale Bank van Aruba

Aruba
Economy of Aruba
1986 establishments in Aruba
Banks established in 1986